The second race of the 2020 Drydene 200 doubleheader was the 21st stock car race of the 2020 NASCAR Xfinity Series season and the 35th iteration of the event. The race was originally going to be held on August 22, 2020 but was delayed by a day due to the COVID-19 pandemic. The race was held on Sunday, August 23, 2020 in Dover, Delaware at Dover International Speedway, a 1 mile (1.6 km) permanent oval-shaped racetrack. The race took the scheduled 200 laps to complete. At race's end, Chase Briscoe of Stewart-Haas Racing would come to dominate and win the race, the 8th NASCAR Xfinity Series win of his career and the 6th of the season. To fill out the podium, Ross Chastain of Kaulig Racing and Austin Cindric of Team Penske would finish 2nd and 3rd, respectively.

Background 
Dover International Speedway is an oval race track in Dover, Delaware, United States that has held at least two NASCAR races since it opened in 1969. In addition to NASCAR, the track also hosted USAC and the NTT IndyCar Series. The track features one layout, a 1 mile (1.6 km) concrete oval, with 24° banking in the turns and 9° banking on the straights. The speedway is owned and operated by Dover Motorsports.

The track, nicknamed "The Monster Mile", was built in 1969 by Melvin Joseph of Melvin L. Joseph Construction Company, Inc., with an asphalt surface, but was replaced with concrete in 1995. Six years later in 2001, the track's capacity moved to 135,000 seats, making the track have the largest capacity of sports venue in the mid-Atlantic. In 2002, the name changed to Dover International Speedway from Dover Downs International Speedway after Dover Downs Gaming and Entertainment split, making Dover Motorsports. From 2007 to 2009, the speedway worked on an improvement project called "The Monster Makeover", which expanded facilities at the track and beautified the track. After the 2014 season, the track's capacity was reduced to 95,500 seats.

Entry list

Starting lineup 
The starting lineup was based on a partial inversion of the previous race, the Saturday's running of the Drydene 200. As a result, Brett Moffitt of Our Motorsports would win the pole.

Race results 
Stage 1 Laps: 45

Stage 2 Laps: 45

Stage 3 Laps: 110

References 

2020 NASCAR Xfinity Series
NASCAR races at Dover Motor Speedway
August 2020 sports events in the United States
2020 in sports in Delaware